Carina Strobel (born 11 September 1997) is a German ice hockey player for the Memmingen Indians and the German national team.

She participated at the 2015 IIHF Women's World Championship.

References

External links

1997 births
Living people
German women's ice hockey defencemen
People from Landsberg am Lech
Sportspeople from Upper Bavaria